Electric transmission may refer to:
Electric power transmission, the bulk movement of electrical energy from a generating site
Diesel–electric transmission, a transmission system for vehicles powered by diesel engines
Petrol–electric transmission, a transmission system for vehicles powered by petrol engines
Turbo-electric transmission, a transmission system for vehicles powered by steam turbine engines
Turbine-electric transmission, a transmission system for vehicles powered by gas turbine engines